Arturo Bravo Sobrino(born May 19, 1958-22,January 2023) was a retired male racewalker from Mexico, who represented his native country at the 1988 Summer Olympics in Seoul, South Korea. He set his personal best (3:52:08) in the men's 50 km walk event in 1987.

His international career stretched through the 1980s, beginning with a fifth-place finish in the 50 km walk at the 1981 IAAF World Race Walking Cup. He won the gold medal in the event at the 1983 CAC Championships. He made his major appearances at the 1987 World Championships in Athletics (finishing eighth) and at the Seoul Olympics (ranking 33rd overall).

Personal bests
50 km: 3:52:08 hrs –  Rome, 5 September 1987

Achievements

References
 sports-reference
 IAAF Fact & Figures

External links

1958 births
Living people
Mexican male racewalkers
Athletes (track and field) at the 1988 Summer Olympics
Olympic athletes of Mexico
World Athletics Championships athletes for Mexico
20th-century Mexican people